Tring-Jonction is a village in the Beauce-Centre Regional County Municipality in the Chaudière-Appalaches region of Quebec, Canada. Its population is 1,526 as of 2021.

It is named after Tring, a town in Hertfordshire, England. "Jonction" refers to the Quebec Central railway station that was built in 1881.

History 
Tring-Jonction was founded in 1918 by Ephrem Lagueux by splitting away from Saint-Frédéric-de-Beauce.

Demographics 

References

Villages in Quebec
Incorporated places in Chaudière-Appalaches